The Meat Union Aotearoa is a trade union in New Zealand. It was formed August 1, 1994 by the merging of the Auckland & Tomoana Freezing Workers Union and the West and East Coast Branches of the New Zealand Meat & Related Trades Workers Union.

The Meat Union has a membership of approximately 10,000 during the peak season, and is affiliated with the New Zealand Council of Trade Unions. It is directly organized with the NZ Meat & Related Trades Workers Union.

External links
 Meat Union Aotearoa official site.

New Zealand Council of Trade Unions
Trade unions in New Zealand
Meat industry trade unions
Meat processing in New Zealand
Trade unions established in 1994